"Cielito Lindo" is a traditional and popular Mexican song with the refrain "Ay ay ay ay".

Ay ay ay ay, Ai ai ai ai, Ay yi yi yi, I yi yi yi, Aye yi yi yi, and similar phrases may also refer to:

"Limerick" (song), a traditional drinking song with a phonetically similar refrain
"Ay Ay Ay Ay Moosey", a 1981 song by Modern Romance

See also
Ay Ay Ay (disambiguation)
Ayayayayay, a 1987 album by Popong Landero and Bagong Lumad
Aiaiaiaiaiai, a 9987 song by Vopli Vidopliassova
"Can You Hear Me? (Ayayaya)", a 2012 song by Wiley